Conistra rubiginosa, the black-spot chestnut, is a moth of the family Noctuidae. The species was first described by Giovanni Antonio Scopoli in his 1763 Entomologia Carniolica. It is found in Europe.

Description
The length of the forewings is 15–16 mm. Warren (1914) states 
vau-punctatum Esp. (= silene F.) (35 h). Forewing rufous or dull purplish, overlaid with grey; the veins finely pale; lines indistinct, paler, with slightly darker edges; submarginal with a rufous cloud before it on costa; some dark marginal lunules; stigmata pale grey, the orbicular with a black crescent in lower half, the reniform with black spots, separated by the pale veins, on lower and outer edges; a small dark spot at base of cell; the costa and base of wing with lilac grey striations; hindwing pale fuscous, with large dull cellspot; fringe pale, sometimes rufous-tinged; — immaculata Stgr. is a rare form in which the stigmata are without the black spots on their margins; — gallica Led. [ now species  Conistra gallica (Lederer, 1857)]] (35 h), from France and the Pyrenees, is a local form in which the purplish ground colour is less obscured by the grey suffusion; the area beyond outer line being dark with the submarginal line well-marked across it; and the bent median shade is also purplish; at the same time the grey suffusion, especially at base and along costa, is more strongly expressed. Larva brown, the dorsal and subdorsal lines pale yellowish; oblique mottled lines meeting to form V-shaped marks on dorsum; spiracles black;head red brown; venter grey; living at first on Prunus, afterwards polyphagous on low plants. Generally distributed in Europe, except Britain.

Biology
The moth flies in one generation from October to late April.

The larvae feed on various shrubs, deciduous trees and herbaceous plants, including common lilac, apple, rose and Prunus spinosa.

Distribution
It is found in central and southern Europe. In the north, the distribution area extends to southern Fennoscandia, Lithuania and Latvia; in the east it extends to Ukraine and western Turkey.
In England records suggesting established breeding populations are scattered in the south where it was first seen in 2011.

References

Notes
The flight season refers to the Netherlands. This may vary in other parts of the range.

External links

Fauna Europaea
Lepiforum e.V.
De Vlinderstichting 

Cuculliinae
Moths described in 1763
Moths of Europe
Taxa named by Giovanni Antonio Scopoli